Microgramma is a genus of ferns in the family Polypodiaceae, subfamily Polypodioideae, according to the Pteridophyte Phylogeny Group classification of 2016 (PPG I). They are commonly known as vine ferns or snakeferns.

Species
, Checklist of Ferns and Lycophytes of the World accepted the following species:

Microgramma baldwinii Brade
Microgramma bifrons (Hook.) Lellinger
Microgramma bismarckii (Rauh) B.León
Microgramma brunei (Wercklé ex Christ) Lellinger
Microgramma cordata (Desv.) Crabbe
Microgramma crispata (Fée) R.M.Tryon & A.F.Tryon
Microgramma dictyophylla (Kunze ex Mett.) de la Sota
Microgramma fosteri B.León & H.Beltrán
Microgramma geminata (Schrad.) R.M.Tryon & A.F.Tryon
Microgramma heterophylla (L.) Wherry
Microgramma latevagans (Maxon & C.Chr.) Lellinger
Microgramma lindbergii (Mett.) de la Sota
Microgramma lycopodioides (L.) Copel.
Microgramma mauritiana (Willd.) Tardieu
Microgramma megalophylla (Desv.) de la Sota
Microgramma microsoroides Salino, T.E.Almeida & A.R.Sm.
Microgramma × moraviana L.D.Gómez
Microgramma mortoniana de la Sota
Microgramma nitida (J.Sm.) A.R.Sm.
Microgramma percussa (Cav.) de la Sota
Microgramma persicariifolia (Schrad.) C.Presl
Microgramma piloselloides (L.) Copel.
Microgramma recreense (Hieron.) Lellinger
Microgramma reptans (Cav.) A.R.Sm.
Microgramma rosmarinifolia (Kunth) R.M.Tryon & A.F.Tryon
Microgramma squamulosa (Kaulf.) de la Sota
Microgramma tecta (Kaulf.) Alston
Microgramma thurnii (Baker) R.M.Tryon & Stolze
Microgramma tobagensis (C.Chr.) C.D.Adams & Baksh.-Com.
Microgramma tuberosa (Maxon) Lellinger
Microgramma ulei (Hieron.) Stolze
Microgramma vaccinifolia (Langsd. & Fisch.) Copel.

Distribution
Species in the genus are native to tropical ecoregions in the Americas and Africa.

Regions and countries include: Mexico, the Caribbean, Central America, South America (including Argentina and Brazil), tropical Africa, southern Africa, and western Indian Ocean islands.

References

Further reading
Schneider, H. et al. 2004. Unraveling the phylogeny of polygrammoid ferns (Polypodiaceae and Grammitidaceae): exploring aspects of the diversification of epiphytic plants. Molec. Phylogenet. Evol. 31:1041-1063.
Salino, A., et al., 2008, A new species of Microgramma (Polypodiaceae) from Brazil and recircumscription of the genus based on phylogenetic evidence, Systematic Botany, 33(4): 630–635.

External links
Efloras.org: Genus Microgramma treatment in Flora of North America

Polypodiaceae
Fern genera